In the Region of Ice is a 1976  American short film directed by Peter Werner, based upon the short story of the same name by Joyce Carol Oates. It was made as a thesis film for the Center for Advanced Film Studies. It won an Oscar at the 49th Academy Awards in 1977 for Best Short Subject. The Academy Film Archive preserved In The Region of Ice in 2012.

Cast
 Fionnula Flanagan as Sister Irene
 Peter Lampert as Allen Weinstein (as Peter Lempert)

References

External links

1976 films
1976 independent films
1976 short films
American independent films
American short films
Films directed by Peter Werner
Live Action Short Film Academy Award winners
1970s English-language films
1970s American films